Julia Nesheiwat is an American national security adviser who served as the 11th homeland security advisor in the Trump administration from 2020 to 2021. She also served in the Bush and Obama administrations.

Early life and education 
The daughter of Jordanian Christian immigrant parents, Nesheiwat is one of five children; she was raised in Umatilla, Florida. Nesheiwat earned a Bachelor of Arts degree from Stetson University, a Master of Arts from Georgetown University, and a PhD from the Tokyo Institute of Technology. She is the sister of Jaclyn Stapp.

Career

Army service
After the September 11 attacks, Nesheiwat served as a U.S. Army military intelligence officer, leaving the Army as a captain. She served consecutive deployments for which she was awarded the Bronze Star Medal in support of Operation Enduring Freedom and Operation Iraqi Freedom. She subsequently served at senior levels on a White House commission, in the Office of the Director of National Intelligence, and in numerous senior economic and national security roles in the State Department spanning the Bush, Obama, and Trump Administrations.

Academics 
After earning her doctorate in science and engineering, Dr. Nesheiwat lectured on the geopolitics of energy, climate, and technology in the 21st century at Naval Postgraduate School’s National Security Affairs Department, Stanford University, and at the University of California, San Diego.

Government service 
Nesheiwat was an international affairs fellow with the Council on Foreign Relations and served on the Governing Advisory Council for the World Economic Forum. Nesheiwat also served on the Governing Advisory Council for Clean Energy at the World Economic Forum and was appointed as deputy assistant secretary of state in the Bureau of Energy Resources. She also served as the energy policy advisor in the department’s economic bureau, was the ex officio committee member for the Florida Ocean Alliance, as well as appointed as the Global Ambassador by the World Green Building Council.

Nesheiwat was involved in efforts to keep families informed and win the release of U.S. citizens held hostage on foreign soil, through a new office partnered with Hostage Recovery Fusion Cell which combines resourced from the Defense and State Department, the Central Intelligence Agency, and Treasury Department. Nesheiwat served as the former U.S. Deputy Presidential Envoy for Hostage Affairs from August 2015 to August 2019.

In August 2019, Florida Governor Ron DeSantis had appointed Nesheiwat as the state's first chief resilience officer. Florida is only the third state (joining Rhode Island and Oregon) to have "designated resilience offices with clear executives that report directly to the governor."  In this role, she was tasked with preparing Florida for the “environmental, physical and economic impacts” of sea level rise, confirmed by a 2014 national climate assessment. Nesheiwat has supported the scientific consensus on climate change and its impact on the state of Florida. Nesheiwat is serving as a distinguished fellow at the Atlantic Council also focused on energy, climate, arctic policy, and national security and was appointed as US Commissioner on the US Arctic Research Commission.

Homeland security advisor 
On February 20, 2020, Politico reported that President Donald Trump would select Nesheiwat to be his new homeland security advisor, according to an administration official and another person familiar with the matter." Robert C. O'Brien later confirmed Nesheiwat's appointment, praising her as a person who has "extensive national security experience, which will be invaluable for this important role."

References

Year of birth missing (living people)
Living people
American people of Jordanian descent
Georgetown University alumni
Tokyo Institute of Technology alumni
Trump administration personnel
Female United States Army officers
United States Army personnel of the Iraq War
United States Army personnel of the War in Afghanistan (2001–2021)
Women in the Iraq War